Sapieginė is a neighborhood of Vilnius located in the Antakalnis Eldership. It is completely within the territory of Pavilniai Regional Park.

The area houses Interwar Polish ammunition bunkers with one of the largest bat wintering spots in southeast Lithuania. The National Blood Center is also located here.

The eastern part of Sapieginė is located within erosion gullies of Pavilniai Regional Park.

History 
Since 16th century, it belonged to the Sapieha noble family.

References 

 Sapieginė. Mažoji lietuviškoji tarybinė enciklopedija, T. 3 (R–Ž). Vilnius, Vyriausioji enciklopedijų redakcija, 1971, p. 159
 Sapieginė. Tarybų Lietuvos enciklopedija, T. 3 (Masaitis-Simno). – Vilnius: Vyriausioji enciklopedijų redakcija, 1987. p. 626

Neighbourhoods of Vilnius